Propylene, also known as propene, is an unsaturated organic compound with the chemical formula . It has one double bond, and is the second simplest member of the alkene class of hydrocarbons. It is a colorless gas with a faint petroleum-like odor.

Production

Steam cracking

The dominant technology for producing propylene is steam cracking. The same technology is used to produce ethylene from ethane.  Cracking propane yields a mixture of ethylene, propylene, methane, hydrogen, etc.  The yield of propylene is about 15%.  The other principal feedstock is naphtha, especially in the Middle East and Asia. 
Propylene can be separated by fractional distillation from hydrocarbon mixtures obtained from cracking and other refining processes; refinery-grade propene is about 50 to 70%. In the United States, shale gas is a major source of propane.

Olefin conversion technology
In the Phillips Triolefin or Olefin conversion technology propylene is interconverted with ethylene and 2-butenes. Rhenium and molybdenum catalysts are used: 
CH2=CH2{}  +  CH3CH=CHCH3   ->[][\text{Re, Mo} \atop \text{catalyst}]   2 CH2=CHCH3

The technology is founded on an olefin metathesis reaction discovered at Phillips Petroleum Company. Propylene yields of about 90 wt% are achieved.

Related is the Methanol-to-Olefins/Methanol-to-Propene process. It converts synthesis gas (syngas) to methanol, and then converts the methanol to ethylene and/or propene. The process produces water as by-product. Synthesis gas is produced from |the reformation of natural gas or by the steam-induced reformation of petroleum products such as naphtha, or by gasification of coal.

Fluid catalytic cracking
High severity fluid catalytic cracking (FCC) uses traditional FCC technology under severe conditions (higher catalyst-to-oil ratios, higher steam injection rates, higher temperatures, etc.) in order to maximize the amount of propene and other light products. A high severity FCC unit is usually fed with gas oils (paraffins) and residues, and produces about 20–25 m% propene on feedstock together with greater volumes of motor gasoline and distillate byproducts. These high temperature processes are expensive and have a high carbon footprint.  For these reasons, alternative routes to propylene continue to attract attention.

Market and research
Propene production has remained static at around 35 million tonnes (Europe and North America only) from 2000 to 2008, but it has been increasing in East Asia, most notably Singapore and China. Total world production of propene is currently about half that of ethylene.

The use of engineered enzymes has been explored but has not been commercialized.

Uses
Propene is the second most important starting product in the petrochemical industry after ethylene. It is the raw material for a wide variety of products.  Polypropylene manufacturers consume nearly two thirds of global production. Polypropylene end uses include films, fibers, containers, packaging, and caps and closures. Propene is also used for the production of important chemicals such as propylene oxide, acrylonitrile, cumene, butyraldehyde, and acrylic acid. In the year 2013 about 85 million tonnes of propene were processed worldwide.

Propene and benzene are converted to acetone and phenol via the cumene process. 

Propene is also used to produce isopropanol (propan-2-ol), acrylonitrile, propylene oxide, and epichlorohydrin.
The industrial production of acrylic acid involves the catalytic partial oxidation of propene. Propylene is an intermediate in the oxidation to acrylic acid.

In industry and workshops, propene is used as an alternative fuel to acetylene in Oxy-fuel welding and cutting, brazing and heating of metal for the purpose of bending. It has become a standard in BernzOmatic products and others in MAPP substitutes, now that true MAPP gas is no longer available.

Reactions
Propene resembles other alkenes in that it undergoes addition reactions relatively easily at room temperature. The relative weakness of its double bond explains its tendency to react with substances that can achieve this transformation. Alkene reactions include: 1) polymerization, 2) oxidation, 3) halogenation and hydrohalogenation, 4) alkylation, 5) hydration, 6) oligomerization, and 7) hydroformylation.

Complexes of transition metals
Foundational to hydroformylation, alkene metathesis, and polymerization are metal-propylene complexes, which are intermediates in these processes.  Propylene is prochiral, meaning that binding of a reagent (such as a metal electrophile) to the C=C group yields one of two enantiomers.

Polymerization 

The majority of propene is used to form polypropylene, a very important commodity thermoplastic, through chain-growth polymerization.  In the presence of a suitable catalyst (typically a Ziegler–Natta catalyst), propene will polymerize. There are multiple ways to achieve this, such as using high pressures to suspending the catalyst in a solution of liquid propene, or running gaseous propene through a fluidized bed reactor.

Combustion
Propene burns in a similar fashion to other alkenes. In the presence of sufficient or excess oxygen, propene burns to form water and carbon dioxide.
2 C3H6 + 9 O2 → 6 CO2 + 6 H2O

Environmental safety
Propene is a product of combustion from forest fires, cigarette smoke, and motor vehicle and aircraft exhaust. It is an impurity in some heating gases. Observed concentrations have been in the range of 0.1-4.8 parts per billion (ppb) in rural air, 4–10.5 ppb in urban air, and 7–260 ppb in industrial air samples.

In the United States and some European countries a threshold limit value of 500 parts per million (ppm) was established for occupational (8-hour time-weighted average) exposure. It is considered a volatile organic compound (VOC) and emissions are regulated by many governments, but it is not listed by the U.S. Environmental Protection Agency (EPA) as a hazardous air pollutant under the Clean Air Act. With a relatively short half-life, it is not expected to bioaccumulate.

Propene has low acute toxicity from inhalation and is not considered to be carcinogenic. Chronic toxicity studies in mice did not yield significant evidence suggesting adverse effects. Humans briefly exposed to 4,000 ppm did not experience any noticeable effects. Propene is dangerous from its potential to displace oxygen as an asphyxiant gas, and from its high flammability/explosion risk.

Bio-propylene is the bio-based propylene.
It has been examined, motivated by diverse interests such a carbon footprint. Production from glucose has been considered. More advanced ways of addressing such issues focus on electrification alternatives to steam cracking.

Storage and handling
Propene is flammable. Propene is usually stored as liquid under pressure, although it is also possible to store it safely as gas at ambient temperature in approved containers.

Occurrence in nature
Propene is detected in the interstellar medium through microwave spectroscopy. On September 30, 2013, NASA also announced that the Cassini orbiter spacecraft, part of the Cassini-Huygens mission, had discovered small amounts of naturally occurring propene in the atmosphere of Titan using spectroscopy.

See also
 Los Alfaques Disaster
 Inhalant abuse
 2014 Kaohsiung gas explosions
 2020 Houston explosion

References

Alkenes
Monomers
Commodity chemicals
Petrochemicals
Gases
Allyl compounds